Grieves (February 23, 1984) is an American hip hop artist.

Grieves may also refer to:

Grieves (surname)

See also
Greaves (disambiguation)
Greeves (disambiguation)
Grieve (disambiguation)